Badr bin Sultan bin Abdulaziz Al Saud (born 1980) is a member of the House of Saud. He was former governor of Al Jawf Region and is the deputy governor of Makkah Province.

Biography
Prince Badr was born in 1980. His parents are Prince Sultan and Hoda bint Abdullah bin Mohammed Al Sheikh. 

On 27 February 2018 Prince Badr was named the governor of the Al Jawf region at the rank of minister succeeding Fahad bin Badr bin Abdulaziz Al Saud in the post. Prince Badr's tenure ended on 27 December 2018 when Faisal bin Nawaf was appointed to the post. Prince Badr was named deputy governor of Makkah Province in the same reshuffle.

Prince Badr is one of the board members of Sultan bin Abdulaziz Al Saud Foundation.

He is married to a daughter of Prince Ahmed bin Abdulaziz in 2015.

References

Badr
Badr
1980 births
Badr
Living people

ar:بدر بن سلطان بن عبد العزيز آل سعود